Faruk Barlas (12 April 1915 – 9 January 1994) was a Turkish footballer. He played in one match for the Turkey national football team in 1937. He was also part of Turkey's squad for the football tournament at the 1936 Summer Olympics, but he did not play in any matches.

References

External links
 

1915 births
1994 deaths
Turkish footballers
Turkey international footballers
Footballers from Istanbul
Association football defenders
Güneş S.K. players